Gordon Sawler (born February 15, 1987) is a former professional Canadian football guard. He was drafted by the Toronto Argonauts in the fifth round of the 2009 CFL Draft. He played CIS football for the St. Francis Xavier X-Men.

On May 11, 2010, Sawler was released by the Argonauts.

External links
Toronto Argonauts bio

1987 births
Living people
Players of Canadian football from Nova Scotia
Canadian football offensive linemen
St. Francis Xavier X-Men football players
Toronto Argonauts players